Avesnes-en-Val is a commune in the Seine-Maritime department in the Normandy region in northern France.

Geography

Population

Places of interest
 The sixteenth century church of St. Aignan.
 The church of Saint-Melaine dating from the sixteenth century.
 The sixteenth century church of Notre-Dame at Villy-le-Haut.

See also
Communes of the Seine-Maritime department

References

Communes of Seine-Maritime